The 1898 Iowa State Cyclones football team represented Iowa State College of Agricultural and Mechanic Arts (later renamed Iowa State University) as an independent during the 1898 college football season. In their fourth year under head coach Pop Warner, the Cyclones compiled a 3–2 record and were outscored by opponents by a combined total of 50 to 49. Simon Tarr was the team captain.

Between 1892 and 1913, the football team played on a field that later became the site of the university's Parks Library.

Schedule

References

Iowa State
Iowa State Cyclones football seasons
Iowa State Cyclones football